Paul David Nussbaum is an American clinical neuropsychologist and an adjunct associate professor in Neurological Surgery at the University of Pittsburgh School of Medicine.

He obtained his B.A. in Psychology in 1985 and his Master's degree in Clinical Psychology in 1987 at the University of Arizona. After completing his M.A., Nussbaum continued to the doctorate program and received his Ph.D in 1991. On the 45th Anniversary of University of Arizona, the university made Nussbaum an honorary alumnus of the class of 1991.

He was the co-founder of a company that launched Fit Brains in 2008.

Publications

References

External links 
[*http://www.paulnussbaum.com/ Business website]

Year of birth missing (living people)
Living people
Neuropsychologists
University of Arizona alumni
University of Pittsburgh faculty